Kenny Guiton (born June 27, 1991) is a former American football quarterback who is the wide receivers coach for the Arkansas Razorbacks. After being an undrafted free agent in the 2014 NFL Draft, he was invited to mini-camp with the Buffalo Bills in 2014. He played college football at Ohio State University. He became a coach in 2015 and has also held positions at Houston, Texas, and Louisiana Tech.

College career

2012 season
Kenny Guiton would see his first meaningful playing time in the eighth game of the 2012 season. Trailing Purdue 14-20 late in the third quarter, Guiton was brought in to replace injured Braxton Miller. Down 14-22 with less than a minute remaining, Guiton lead the Buckeye offense on 61 yard drive, capped off with a touchdown pass to Chris Fields and a game tying two-point conversion pass to Jeff Heuerman. The Buckeyes would prevail 29-22 in overtime, preserving an unblemished 8-0 record in a season that Ohio State would finish 12-0.

2013 season
In the second game of the season against San Diego State, Guiton would again be called upon to replace an injured Braxton Miller. Guiton played the remainder of the game and would start the subsequent next two games, all Buckeye victories.

In his second start, Guiton set an Ohio State single-game record with a six touchdown pass first-half performance against Florida A&M.

Statistics

Professional career
After failing to earn a contract with the Buffalo Bills following their mini-camp, Guiton was assigned to the Los Angeles KISS of the Arena Football League. Guiton started his first game for the KISS on July 6, 2014, against the San Jose SaberCats. Guiton was reassigned by the KISS on December 4, 2014.

Coaching career

Houston
Following his playing career Guiton entered the coaching profession, serving as a graduate assistant at the University of Houston under his former offensive coordinator at Ohio State and Houston head coach, Tom Herman. On December 29, 2016, he followed Herman to the University of Texas, where he served as an offensive quality control assistant in charge of wide receivers. However in April 2017, Guiton returned to Houston as the team’s wide receivers coach.

Stephen F. Austin
After two seasons with Houston, he was first hired in the offseason by Stephen F. Austin to be their outside wide receivers coach, but was lured to Louisiana Tech to serve in the same role.

Louisiana Tech
He spent the 2019 season with Louisiana Tech as the team’s wide receivers coach.

Colorado State
In 2020 he was hired by Colorado State to be their pass game coordinator and wide receivers coach.

Arkansas
In 2020, Guiton was hired as the Arkansas Razorback's wide receiver's Coach for the 2021 season.

References

External links
 Colorado State profile

1991 births
Living people
American football quarterbacks
Houston Cougars football coaches
Los Angeles Kiss players
Ohio State Buckeyes football players
Texas Longhorns football coaches
Sportspeople from Houston
Players of American football from Houston
African-American coaches of American football
African-American players of American football
Louisiana Tech Bulldogs football coaches
Colorado State Rams football coaches